Cardiff Arms Park Male Choir is a Welsh Male choir based at Cardiff Arms Park in Cardiff, Wales, United Kingdom.

History
On 1 September 1966, following Cardiff RFC's 35–0 defeat of Cardiff & District, a group of supporters came up with idea of forming a choir to improve the standard of after-match singing. The Cardiff Athletic Male Voice Choir first met on the following Monday, 5 September, in the old Skittle Alley at the Rugby Club. There were twenty-five members present for the first meeting. The choir changed its name in 2000 to become the Cardiff Arms Park Male Choir, helping to raise the profile of the choir and perpetuate the name of the Arms Park.

The choir made their first TV appearance within weeks of being formed, welcoming the Australian Rugby Team to Wales, and has since appeared on television on numerous occasions, including appearances on BBC, Sky Sports, ITV, Channel 4, New Zealand and Australian TV and MUTV. The choir sang live on Grandstand in 2002 and recorded an advertisement for the BBC's Six Nations rugby coverage alongside Goldie Lookin Chain in 2006. The choir were also filmed for an in-flight advertisement for Qantas airlines.  They appeared on the Rogue Trader section of Watchdog, made a very brief appearance on Strictly Come Dancing and supported Ant & Dec in a link for Britain's Got Talent.

The choir has performed alongside numerous stars, including Hayley Westenra, Charlotte Church, Max Boyce, Peter Karrie, Shân Cothi, Goldie Lookin Chain and Foreigner.

The choir has travelled to Scotland (Blairgowrie in 1993, Perth and Crieff in 2009 and 2011), Ireland (Kilkenny in 1998), the Czech Republic (Prague, Plzen and Karlštejn in 2004), France (Pleyben in 2004 Chatte in 2006 and [(Strasbourg)] in 2012), Switzerland (Le Brassus in 2006), Italy (Milan in 2006), Germany (Heilbronn, Satteldorf and Stuttgart in 2007), Poland (Kraków in 2009) and Spain (Santander in 2010). Some of the choir joined as guests of Dowlais Male Choir in their performances at the 2008 Festival Interceltique de Lorient.

In the UK, the choir has performed in a variety of venues, including nine appearances at the London Welsh Festivals of Male Choirs in the Royal Albert Hall, singing before Wales v Fiji in 2002 and Wales v South Africa in 2008 at the Millennium Stadium and numerous appearances at Cardiff Arms Park itself. The choir took part in the World Choir at the National Stadium in Cardiff in 1993.

In 2009 the choir sang at the opening of the new Cardiff library. The Manic Street Preachers opened the library, and the choir sang a specially arranged version of their song A Design for Life, which was described by bassist Nicky Wire as "spine-tingling".

The choir sang at the opening of the new John Lewis department store in Cardiff in September 2009 as well as recording their radio advertisement. The choir's involvement was included in a subsequent BBC documentary.

Massed Choir Festivals
The choir celebrated its fortieth anniversary in 2006 with a number of events, including a dinner at the Arms Park and a European tour. The main event was a massed male concert at St David's Hall, Cardiff on 17 June. The concert featured over 400 singers made up of choristers from Canoldir, Dowlais, Gwent, Kenfig Hill, Maesteg, Neath, Penybontfawr and Pontarddulais male choirs alongside the Cardiff choristers. They were accompanied by a 53-strong orchestra, and the guest artists were the Llanishen Fach Primary School choir and Hayley Westenra.

Following on from the success of the massed concert in 2006, the choir joined forces with Canoldir Male Choir (based in Birmingham) to create the AngloWelsh Festival of Male Choirs. The first concerts of the biennial festival took place in April/May 2009 in Symphony Hall, Birmingham and St David's Hall, Cardiff. Participating choirs were Cardiff Arms Park, Canoldir, Dowlais, Kenfig Hill, Kidderminster, Leigh Orpheus, Neath, Shrewsbury, Penybontfawr and Pontypridd male choirs. The guest artists were Les Chansonelles and John Garner in Birmingham, and Llanishen Fach Primary School choir and Shân Cothi in Cardiff.

The second AngloWelsh Festival of Male Choirs took place in St David's Hall, Cardiff on 10 September 2011.  The massed choir was made up of Biddulph, Budleigh Salterton, Cardiff Arms Park, Canoldir, Cotswold, Dowlais, Mynyddislwyn, Newtown & District, Pontypridd, Shrewsbury, Tenby and Ynysowen male choirs.  Guest artists were the Llanishen Fach Primary School choir and Gary Griffiths.

Recordings

The Blue Blacks
 Sloop John B
 Cwm Rhondda
 Calon Lân
 World in Union
 Comrades in Arms
 Sanctus
 The Lord's Prayer
 Oh Isis And Osiris
 A Roman War Song
 An American Trilogy
 The Rose
 Bring Him Home
 Ivor Novello Medley
 Steal Away
 Let It Be Me
 Take Me Home
 Amen (This Little Light)
 Sloop John B

Live!
 With A Voice of Singing
 Let It Be Me
 The Rhythm of Life
 Soldiers' Chorus
 Heaven Is My Home (with Australian Welsh Male Choir, Katie Murphy and Richard Colvin)
 Amen (This Little Light)
 There Is Nothin' Like A Dame (with Jack Gardiner)
 The Rose
 Bui Doi (with Richard Colvin)
 My Lord, What A Morning (with Wessex Male Choir)
 An American Trilogy (with Wessex Male Choir)
 Mae Hen Wlad Fy Nhadau (with Australian Welsh Male Choir)

Massed Male Choral Celebration
Recorded live at St David's Hall, Cardiff on 17 June 2006, featuring the massed voices of Cardiff Arms Park, Canoldir, Dowlais, Gwent, Kenfig Hill, Maesteg, Neath, Penybontfawr and Pontarddulais male choirs and a 53-strong orchestra.
 Welsh Prelude [Orchestra]
 This Is The Moment [Massed Choir]
 Gwahoddiad [Massed Choir]
 Men of Harlech [Massed Choir]
 Consider Yourself [Llanishen Fach Primary School Choir]
 My Friend [Llanishen Fach Primary School Choir]
 Chorus of the Hebrew Slaves (Speed Your Journey) [Massed Choir]
 Soldiers' Chorus [Massed Choir]
 My Lord, What A Morning [Massed Choir]
 An American Trilogy [Massed Choir]
 Love in My Heart [Llanishen Fach Primary School Choir]
 There's Me [Llanishen Fach Primary School Choir]
 Finlandia [Massed Choir]
 Deus Salutis (Llef) [Massed Choir]
 Llanfair [Massed Choir]
 Morte Criste [Massed Choir]
 Whistle Down The Wind [Llanishen Fach Primary School Choir]
 As One [Llanishen Fach Primary School Choir]
 Nidaros [Massed Choir]
 God Save The Queen [Massed Choir]
 Hen Wlad Fy Nhadau [Massed Choir]

Hearts And Voices Raising
Recorded live at Symphony Hall, Birmingham and St David's Hall, Cardiff at the inaugural AngloWelsh Festival of Male Choirs, 2009, featuring the massed voices of Cardiff Arms Park, Canoldir, Dowlais, Kenfig Hill, Kidderminster, Leigh Orpheus, Neath, Shrewsbury, Penybontfawr and Pontypridd Male Choirs.
 Christus Salvator [Massed Choir]
 A Roman War Song [Massed Choir]
 Morte Criste [Massed Choir]
 Love, Shine A Light [Llanishen Fach Primary School Choir]
 You Are My Brother [Llanishen Fach Primary School Choir]
 Comrades in Arms [Massed Choir]
 Hava Nagila [Massed Choir]
 Dream A Little Dream of Me [Les Chansonelles]
 The Rose/Hello My Friend [Les Chansonelles]
 Autumn Leaves [Massed Choir]
 Give Me That Old Time Religion [Massed Choir]
 Blaenwern [Massed Choir and Audience]
 Stand By Me [Llanishen Fach Primary School Choir]
 I Wanna Sing Scat [Llanishen Fach Primary School Choir]
 Trust [Llanishen Fach Primary School Choir]
 Softly As I Leave You [Massed Choir]
 The Rhythm of Life [Massed Choir]
 Fields of Gold [Les Chansonelles]
 Somebody To Love [Les Chansonelles]
 Myfanwy [Massed Choir]
 Tydi A Roddaist [Massed Choir]
 An American Trilogy [Massed Choir and Les Chansonelles]

We Raise Our Voices High
Provisional title of the recording of the 2011 AngloWelsh Festival of Male Choirs, which took place on 10 September at St David's Hall, Cardiff.

Musical Staff
Ieuan Jones is the current musical director of the choir, and Joseph Cavalli-Price is the accompanist.

Musical Directors
 1966–1982: John Davies
 1982–1987: Bill Cooper
 1987–1989: David N Jones
 1989–1994: Mary Lloyd
 1994–2001: Edgar Taylor
 2001– 2016: David Last
 2016–present: Ieuan Jones

Accompanists
 1966–1983: Justin Beynon
 1983–1985: Dorothy Lewis
 1985–1988: Marjorie Collier
 1988–1989: David Huw Rees
 1989–2002: Mary Jones
 2002–2004: Joseph Hood
 2004–2004: Kirsten Watson
 2005–2017: Jo Scullin
 2017–2020: Joseph Cavalli-Price
 2020–present: David Last

Notes

External links 
 

Welsh choirs
Musical groups established in 1966
1966 establishments in Wales